is a Japanese hotel chain, consisting of four hotels in Asakusa, Ikebukuro, Jimbocho, and Hatagaya, all in central Tokyo.

References

External links
 
 TV reportage from one of Tokyo's major TV stations, Tokyo MX, listing Sakura Hostel Asakusa as the most popular hotel among foreign visitors in Tokyo.
 Japanese National Geographic featuring the Sakura Hotel's cafes' international cuisine selection.
 Article from the Japanese website Excite Bit about the foreign visitor targeting hotels.
 Sakura Hotel Ikebukuro visitor reviews

Hotels in Tokyo